The dusky snake eel (Ophichthus cylindroideus, also known as the tentacle-nose eel) is an eel in the family Ophichthidae (worm/snake eels). It was described by Camillo Ranzani in 1839. It is a tropical, marine eel which is known from the western Atlantic Ocean, including Cuba and Brazil.

References

Ophichthus
Taxa named by Camillo Ranzani
Fish described in 1839